Streptomyces broussonetiae is a bacterium species from the genus of Streptomyces which has been isolated from rhizospheric soil of the plant Broussonetia papyrifera.

See also 
 List of Streptomyces species

References 

broussonetiae
Bacteria described in 2020